We Love You, Sally Carmichael! is a 2017 American comedy film directed by Christopher Gorham in his directorial debut. Written by Daryn Tufts, it stars Gorham, Bitsie Tulloch, Sebastian Roché, Jack McBrayer, Paula Marshall, David Nibley, and Andie Nibley.

Principal photography began in June 2016. The film was released in the United States on August 4, 2017, by Purdie Distribution.

Cast
 Christopher Gorham as Simon Hayes
 Bitsie Tulloch as Tess Perkins
 Sebastian Roché as Perry Quinn
 Andie Nibley as Andie Perkins
 Jack McBrayer as Darren
 Paula Marshall as Diane
 David Nibley as Brad King
 Alicia Hannah as Alex
 Felicia Day as Sarah
 Perez Hilton as himself

References

External links

2017 films
2017 comedy films
American comedy films
2017 directorial debut films
2010s English-language films
2010s American films